Plant Systematics and Evolution is a biannual peer-reviewed scientific journal covering systematic botany and evolutionary biology. The editors-in-chief are Marcus A. Koch (Heidelberg University), Martin A. Lysak, (Masaryk University), and Karol Marhold (Slovak Academy of Sciences).

History 
In 1858 the publication was renamed  (Austrian Journal of Botany) and it continued under that title from volume 9 to 91. In 1943 and 1944, two volumes were published under the title  (Viennese Botanical Journal). It then continued under its previous title until 1973 when it was relaunched with a more international scope under its current title.

Abstracting and indexing
The journal is abstracted and indexed in Agricola, Biological Abstracts, CAB Abstracts, Chemical Abstracts Service, EMBiology, International Bibliography of Periodical Literature, Scopus, Current Contents/Agriculture, Biology & Environmental Sciences, The Zoological Record, BIOSIS Previews, and the Science Citation Index. According to the Journal Citation Reports, the journal has a 2013 impact factor of 1.154.

References

External links 
 

Publications established in 1851
Botany journals
English-language journals
Biannual journals
Springer Science+Business Media academic journals
1851 establishments in the Austrian Empire